Chantal Quesnel (sometimes credited as Chantal Quesnelle, born 1971) is a Canadian actress. She currently is a voice actress for the TV animated series Zeroman, shown in Canada on Teletoon. She also appeared in Don Mancini's film Curse of Chucky.

Career
Her most extensive TV role was as Yvonne Bernini, on Paradise Falls, a soap opera on Showcase Television, starting in 2001. She has also had several roles, mainly on TV movies and in George A. Romero's Bruiser.  She has had guest roles on various TV series, such as Odyssey 5, Sue Thomas: F.B.Eye, Goosebumps, La Femme Nikita and Forever Knight.
Most recently Chantal has played the role of "The Cougar" in SpikeTV's Blue Mountain State. Her role "The Cougar" is a sex-crazed older woman that looks for sexual relations with the younger football players and later gets pregnant by their coach.

She also appeared in the video game Far Cry 2.

External links

Official web site for Paradise Falls - Contains profile of Chantal Quesnel and her character Yvonne Bernini.

Canadian film actresses
Canadian television actresses
Canadian voice actresses
Canadian soap opera actresses
Living people
1971 births
20th-century Canadian actresses
21st-century Canadian actresses